is a Japanese manga series, based on Yukito Ayatsuji's novel of the same name, illustrated by Hiro Kiyohara. It was serialized in Kodansha's seinen manga magazine Monthly Afternoon from August 2019 to April 2022, with its chapters collected in five tankōbon volumes. In North America, the manga is licensed by Kodansha USA.

Plot 
It tells the story of a group of seven university students who travel to a deserted island where a strange decagonal mansion stands. It was the scene of a grisly mass murder six months earlier, and events soon turn ominous.

Publication
The Decagon House Murders, based on Yukito Ayatsuji's novel of the same name and illustrated by Hiro Kiyohara, was serialized in Kodansha's seinen manga magazine Monthly Afternoon from August 24, 2019, to April 25, 2022. Kodansha collected its chapters in five individual tankōbon volumes, released from November 22, 2019, to May 23, 2022.

Kodansha USA publishes the series digitally in North America from August 17, 2021, to November 29, 2022.

Volume list

References

External links
 

Horror anime and manga
Kodansha manga
Manga based on novels
Mystery anime and manga
Seinen manga
Thriller anime and manga